Promyslovy is a rural locality (a settlement) in Tabun-Aralsky Selsoviet of Yenotayevsky District, Astrakhan Oblast, Russia. The population was 41 as of 2010. There is 1 street.

Geography 
Promyslovy is located 52 km southeast of Yenotayevka (the district's administrative centre) by road. Seroglazka is the nearest rural locality.

References 

Rural localities in Yenotayevsky District